Henoch (Henryk) Barczyński (15 December 1896,  Łódź – 14 March 1941 (?) in Tomaszów Mazowiecki) was a Polish painter of Jewish descent, graphic artist, illustrator.

Biography
Henoch Barczyński was a son of Szmul Barczyński, tailor, and Sara née Parzęczewska. In years 1912-14 he studied graphics in Jakub Katsenbogen's drawing school in Lodz. Later he was a pupil of Henryk Glicenstein in Warsaw. In years 1919-1926 he studied painting at the Academy of Fine Art in Dresden. He was connected with the artistic group Yung-yidish in Łódź. In 1925 he won the first prize for a propaganda poster during the International Red Cross Contest. He visited France, Spain and Italy. He spend some months in Paris and Prague. In years 1927-33 he lived in Berlin. In 1933 he returned to Łódź (Poland). In 1933-39 he lived in his Heimatstadt.

In September 1939 he settled in Tomaszów Mazowiecki. In this town he created an artistic circle. He is mentioned six times in Lutek Orenbach's Letters from the Tomaszów Ghetto. The last mention is dated (December 25, 1940).

He was killed by the Nazis in 1941 (probably 14 March) in Tomaszów Mazowiecki.

Artistic works 
Barczyński's artistic works were influenced by Marc Chagall and Oskar Kokoschka, and motivated by the everyday life of the Polish Jews. He painted in water colors, practiced copper plate engraving and etching. His art-works were exhibited in Berlin, Dresden, Tel Aviv, New York City and Łódź.

Bibliography 
 A. M. Dorman, Autour de l’art juif. Encyclopédie universelle des peintres, sculpteurs et photographes, Chatou 2003, s. 24, sv. Henryk Barczynski, 1896-1941.
Andrzej Kempa, Marek Szukalak, The Biographical Dictionary of the Jews from Lodz, Łódź 2006: Oficyna Bibliofilów and Fundacja Monumentum Iudaicum Lodzense, pp. 17–18, sv. Barczyński (BarcińskI) Henoch (Henryk).
 Józef Sandel, Barczyński (Barciński) Henryk (Henoch), [w:] Słownik artystów polskich i obcych w Polsce działających. Malarze, rzeźbiarze, graficy [Dictionary of the Polish and Foreign Artists worked in Poland. Painters, sculptors, graphic artists], vol. 1 (A-C), Wrocław - Warszawa - Kraków - Gdańsk 1971, pp. 213–214 (in Polish).
 Krzysztof Tomasz Witczak, Słownik biograficzny Żydów tomaszowskich [The Biographical Dictionary of Jews from Tomaszów Mazowiecki], Łódź - Tomaszów Mazowiecki 2010: Łódź University Press, . pp. 32–35 (in Polish; it contains biographical note, photo, artistic works, bibliography).

1896 births
1941 deaths
Modern artists
Jewish artists
Artists from Łódź
People from Tomaszów Mazowiecki
Polish painters of Jewish descent
20th-century Polish painters
20th-century Polish male artists
Polish civilians killed in World War II
Polish male painters